The ALFA Combat is a Czech-made semi-automatic pistol created for military, law enforcement, and sport shooting purposes. The ALFA Combat is one of two series of pistols manufactured by ALFA with the other being the Defender series.

See also
 List of firearms
 List of pistols
 ALFA Defender
 Series ALFA
 Series ALFA steel

References

External links
 Manufacturer's Page

.45 ACP semi-automatic pistols